IJA may refer to:

 Imperial Japanese Army
 International Journal of Astrobiology
 International Jugglers' Association
 International Journal of Audiology
 International Juridical Association (1931–1942)